Abufari Biological Reserve is a biological reserve in the state of Amazonas, Brazil.
It is mostly lowland tropical rainforest, with very diverse flora and fauna.

Location

The Abufari Biological Reserve is in the Amazon biome in the municipality of Tapauá, Amazonas.
It is administered by the Chico Mendes Institute for Biodiversity Conservation.
To the northeast the reserve adjoins the  Piagaçu-Purus Sustainable Development Reserve, established in 2003.
The Purus River and its tributaries run through the reserve, which also includes a system of lagoons.

Environment

The reserve has one of the largest nesting areas for freshwater Amazon turtles, where more than 200,000 freshwater turtles are born each year.
Species include the endangered Arrau turtle (Podocnemis expansa), the six-tubercled Amazon River turtle (Podocnemis sextuberculata) and the yellow-spotted river turtle (Podocnemis unifilis).
The Abufari reserve has several areas of extreme diversity including the Chapéu complex, an ecosystem that consists of hundreds of lakes, ponds, creeks and areas of flooded forest.

Migratory bird species include American purple gallinule (Porphyrio martinicus), solitary sandpiper (Tringa solitaria), yellow-billed tern (Sternula superciliaris), black skimmer (Rynchops niger), yellow-billed cuckoo (Coccyzus americanus), Swainson's flycatcher (Myiarchus swainsoni), osprey (Pandion haliaetus), tropical kingbird, fork-tailed flycatcher (Tyrannus savana), southern rough-winged swallow (Stelgidopteryx ruficollis), grey-breasted martin (Progne chalybea) and sand martin (Riparia riparia).

Conservation

The Abufari Biological Reserve is a "strict nature reserve" under IUCN protected area category Ia.
The purpose is full preservation of its biota and other natural attributes without direct human interference.
Protected species include giant otter (Pteronura brasiliensis), cougar (Puma concolor) and Amazonian manatee (Trichechus inunguis).
An ordinance of 9 January 2012 provided for a consistent and integrated approach to preparing management plans for the conservation units in the BR-319 area of influence. These are the Abufari Biological Reserve, Cuniã Ecological Station, Nascentes do Lago Jari and Mapinguari national parks, Balata-Tufari, Humaitá and Iquiri national forests, and the Lago do Capanã-Grande, Rio Ituxi, Médio Purus and Lago do Cuniã extractive reserves.

References

Sources

Biological reserves of Brazil
Protected areas of Amazonas (Brazilian state)
Protected areas established in 1982
1982 establishments in Brazil